Vanessa Frazier is a Maltese diplomat currently serving as Permanent Representative to the United Nations. Prior to her UN job, she served as ambassador to Brussels, Belgium, Luxembourg and NATO. At the UN, she was elected Chair of the UN Second Committee, the Economic and Financial Committee, for the 76th Session of the United Nations General Assembly (UNGA) in 2021. She is the first woman to lead all women members UN Second Committee, the Economic and Financial Committee and the first woman to hold the position of Malta Permanent Representative to the UN.

Education 
Frazier obtained a Bachelor’s degree in Business Management and French from Luther College in the United States and a Master’s degree in Diplomatic Studies majoring in International Law from the University of Malta. She holds an Honorary Doctorate in recognition of her career achievements.

Career 
She began her diplomatic career as a student diplomat in 1992 and was appointed to the post of First Secretary in 1994 and serving in the Ministry of Foreign Affairs as a Desk Officer for the United States and the Americas and later redeployed to the Mediterranean Department. She was appointed Ambassador and served in Brussels, Belgium, Luxembourg and NATO before being moved to Italy in 2013 and accredited to San Marino and the Rome-based UN bodies.

References 

Maltese diplomats
University of Malta alumni
Permanent Representatives of Malta to the United Nations
Year of birth missing (living people)
Living people
Permanent Representatives of Malta to NATO
Ambassadors of Malta to Belgium
Ambassadors of Malta to Italy
Ambassadors of Malta to Luxembourg
Ambassadors of Malta to San Marino